Elevator is a 1995 Iranian film written and directed by Hossein Shahabi (Persian: حسین شهابی).

Starring
 Nasim Shahed
 Rasool Abdi
 Hossein Alami
 Karim Nobakht
 Koorosh Davoodi
 Azar Vakil

Crew
 cinematography: Hossein Shahabi
 Sound Recorder: Shayan Marami
 Costume Designer: Peyman Aria
 Music: Hossein Shahabi
 Production: Baran film house

References

1997 films
Iranian drama films
Films directed by Hossein Shahabi